Charles Edward Austen-Leigh (30 June 1832 – 17 November 1924) was an English first-class cricketer and Principal Clerk of Committees in the House of Commons.

The son of The Reverend James Edward Austen-Leigh and his wife Emma, he was born at Tring in June 1832. His father was a nephew to the novelist Jane Austen. He was educated firstly at Winchester College, before transferring to Harrow School which he attended until 1851. From Harrow he went up to Balliol College, Oxford. He played first-class cricket in 1861 and 1862, making two appearances for the Marylebone Cricket Club against Sussex and Middlesex, scoring 16 runs and taking 3 wickets. Austen-Leigh later served as Principal Clerk of Committees in the House of Commons from 1892 until his retirement in 1897. He died, aged 92, at Alfriston in November 1924. His brothers, Arthur, Cholmeley and Spencer were all first-class cricketers.

References

External links

1832 births
1924 deaths
People from Tring
People educated at Winchester College
People educated at Harrow School
Alumni of Balliol College, Oxford
English cricketers
Marylebone Cricket Club cricketers
Austen family
Jane Austen
People from Alfriston